Bloodlines is the second studio album from Alex Faith. Collision Records released the album on October 30, 2015.

Critical reception

Awarding the album three and a half stars at Jesus Freak Hideout, Kevin Hoskins states, "Bloodlines is a little simplistic in its production and lyrical content." Dwayne Lacy, giving the album four and a half stars from New Release Today, writes, "Bloodlines is the album that hip hop needs". Rating the album an eight out of ten for Cross Rhythms, Steve Hayes says, "while throughout great production and inventive flows keep our attention."

Track listing

Chart performance

References

2015 albums
Alex Faith albums